Ivan Benito (born 27 August 1976 in Aarau) is a Swiss former professional footballer who played as goalkeeper.

He is the uncle of Loris Benito.

References

External links
 
 

Living people
1976 births
People from Aarau
Association football goalkeepers
Swiss men's footballers
Swiss people of Spanish descent
FC Aarau players
U.S. Pistoiese 1921 players
S.S. Juve Stabia players
Grasshopper Club Zürich players
Swiss expatriate sportspeople in Italy
Swiss expatriate footballers
Sportspeople from Aargau